Przemysław Zadura (born 26 April 1988) is a Polish handball player for Gwardia Opole and the Polish national team.

References

1988 births
Living people
Polish male handball players
People from Opole